Philip of Spain is the name of several Spanish monarchs:

 Philip I of Castile or Philip I of Spain (1478–1506)
 Philip II of Spain (1527–1598)
 Philip III of Spain (1578–1621)
 Philip IV of Spain (1605–1665)
 Philip V of Spain (1683–1746)
 Philip of Spain (1712–1719)
 Philip VI of Spain (born 1968), known as Felipe VI of Spain